James Arthur McCabe   was a Major League Baseball player. He played shortstop in three games for the 1909 Cincinnati Reds and in 13 games for the 1910 Cincinnati Reds.

External links
Baseball Reference

1881 births
1944 deaths
Cincinnati Reds players
Baseball players from Pennsylvania
Major League Baseball outfielders
Meriden Silverites players
Waterbury Authors players
New London Whalers players
New Britain Perfectos players
Buffalo Bisons (minor league) players
Jersey City Skeeters players
Ridgway (minor league baseball) players
Shamokin (minor league baseball) players